Otto (or Eudes) of Vermandois (29 August 979 – 25 May 1045), Count of Vermandois, was the son of Herbert III, Count of Vermandois and Ermengarde of Bar-sur-Seine. He succeeded his brother, Adalbert II as count of Vermandois in 1015.  Otto donated property to Notre-Dame de Homblières by charter.

Family and children
He married Pavia (or Patia) (b. 990). Their children were:
Herbert IV, Count of Vermandois.
Eudes
Peter

References

Sources

Herbertien dynasty
979 births
1045 deaths